Badminton at the 2011 Canada Winter Games was at Canada Games Centre in Halifax, NS.  It was held from the 21 to 27 February.  There were 6 events of badminton.

Medal table
The following is the medal table for badminton at the 2011 Canada Winter Games.

Men's events

Women's events

Mixed events

References

External links 
The Results

2011 Canada Winter Games
Canada Games 2011
Canada Winter Games